Stavros Exakoustidis (born 3 July 1987) is a Greek kickboxer fighting in the super featherweight division of K-1.

Kickboxing career

Early career

Superkombat Fighting Championship 
Exakoustidis was scheduled to challenge Qasim Nisar for the ICO Professional World Super Lightweight title at Full Contact on November 23, 2014. He lost the fight by unanimous decision.

Exakoustidis was scheduled to face Nikos Hysen at Best fighter 2015 on February 21, 2015. He lost the fight by unanimous decision.

Exakoustidis returned to winning ways by defeating Pietro Doorje by decision at Gladiator Nights 9 on April 7, 2015. He was next scheduled to face Cristian Spetcu at SUPERKOMBAT World Grand Prix II on May 7, 2016. Exakoustidis won the fight by unanimous decision. Exakoustidis was scheduled to face Deng Zeqi at Glory of Heroes 4 on August 6, 2016. He won the fight by a second-round technical knockout. The two of them fought at immediate rematch at Glory of Heroes 6 on January 14, 2017. Zeqi won the rematch by a second-round technical knockout.

K-1
Exakoustidis was scheduled to make his K-1 debut against Taiga Kawabe at K-1 World GP 2017 Welterweight Championship Tournament on September 18, 2017. He won the fight by a first-round technical knockout.

Exakoustidis was scheduled to face Kosuke Komiyama at K-1 World GP 2017 Heavyweight Championship Tournament on November 23, 2017. He lost the fight by unanimous decision. Exakoustidis was next scheduled to face Takeru Segawa at K-1 World GP 2018: K'FESTA.1, in the semifinals of the K-1 super featherweight tournament. He lost the fight by unanimous decision.

Exakoustidis was scheduled to face Koji at K-1 World GP 2018: inaugural Cruiserweight Championship Tournament on September 24, 2018. He lost the fight by unanimous decision.

Exakoustidis then returned to his native Greece to challenge Jonathan Invernino for the ICO Professional World Super Lightweight title at Open Championship on March 16, 2019. He won the fight by a first-round technical knockout.

Exakoustidis was scheduled to face Toshi at GRACHAN 40 × BFC vol.3 on June 2, 2019. He won the fight by a second-round technical knockout.

Exakoustidis was scheduled to face Tatsuya Oiwa at K-1 World GP 2019 Japan: ～Women's Flyweight Championship Tournament～ on December 28, 2019. He lost the fight by unanimous decision.

Exakoustidis faced Tomoya Yokoyama in the 2022 K-1 Super Featherweight World Grand Prix at K-1 World GP 2022 Yokohamatsuri on September 11, 2022. He stepped in as a replacement for Bailey Sugden, who withdrew with an injury. He lost the fight by a third-round knockout.

Titles and accomplishments

 2019 ICO Professional World Super Lightweight Champion
 2010 WAKO European Champion
 2006 ISKA World Champion
 2005 WPO World Champion

Professional kickboxing record

|-  style="text-align:center; background:#fbb;"
| 2022-09-11 || Loss || align=left| Tomoya Yokoyama ||  K-1 World GP 2022 Yokohamatsuri, Tournament Quarterfinals  || Yokohama, Japan || KO (High kick) || 3 || 1:41 
|- style="background:#fbb;"
| 2019-12-28|| Loss||align=left| Tatsuya Oiwa || K-1 World GP 2019 Japan: ～Women's Flyweight Championship Tournament～ || Nagoya, Japan || Decision (Unanimous) || 3 || 3:00
|-  style="background:#cfc;"
| 2019-06-02|| Win ||align=left| Toshi || GRACHAN 40 × BFC vol.3|| Tokyo, Japan|| TKO (Low Kick)|| 2 || 2:16
|-  style="background:#cfc;"
| 2019-03-16|| Win ||align=left| Jonathan Invernino||Open Championship || Greece|| TKO || 1 || 
|-
! style=background:white colspan=9 |
|-  style="background:#FFBBBB;"
| 2018-09-24 || Loss|| align=left| Koji || K-1 World GP 2018: inaugural Cruiserweight Championship Tournament || Saitama, Japan || Decision || 3 || 3:00
|-  style="background:#cfc;"
| 2018-05-12|| Win|| align=left| Alex Avogadro || La Notte Dei Campioni || Italy || Decision || 3 || 3:00
|-  bgcolor="#FFBBBB"
| 2018-03-21 || Loss|| align=left| Takeru || K-1 World GP 2018: K'FESTA.1 -60 kg World Tournament, Quarter Finals || Saitama, Japan || Decision (Unanimous) || 3 || 3:00
|-  style="background:#FFBBBB;"
| 2017-11-23|| Loss|| align=left| Kosuke Komiyama || K-1 World GP 2017 Heavyweight Championship Tournament|| Japan || Decision (Unanimous) || 3 || 3:00
|-  style="background:#cfc;"
| 2017-09-18|| Win ||align=left| Taiga|| K-1 World GP 2017 Welterweight Championship Tournament|| Tokyo, Japan|| KO (Three Knockdowns/Left Hook) || 1 || 2:41
|-
|-  style="background:#FFBBBB;"
| 2017-04-22|| Loss || align=left| Youssouf Binate || Partouche Kickboxing Tour 2017, Semi Final || France || Decision || 3 || 3:00
|-  style="background:#FFBBBB;"
| 2017-01-14|| Loss || align=left| Deng Zeqi || Glory of Heroes 6 || Jiyuan, China || TKO (Right Hook)|| 2 || 0:10
|-  style="background:#cfc;"
| 2016-08-06|| Win || align=left| Deng Zeqi || Glory of Heroes 4 || Changzhi, China || TKO || 2 ||
|-  style="background:#cfc;"
| 2016-05-07|| Win || align=left| Cristian Spetcu ||  SUPERKOMBAT World Grand Prix II  || Bucharest, Romania || Decision (Unanimous) || 3 || 3:00
|-  style="background:#cfc;"
| 2015-04|| Win|| align=left| Pietro Doorje|| Gladiator Nights 9 || Greece ||Decision || 3 || 3:00
|-  style="background:#FFBBBB;"
| 2015-02-21|| Win || align="left" | Nikos Hysen || Best fighter 2015 || Greece || Decision (Unanimous) || 3 || 3:00
|-  style="background:#FFBBBB;"
| 2014-11-23|| Loss || align="left" | Qasim Nisar||Full Contact
|England || Decision (Unanimous)|| 10 || 2:00
|-
! style=background:white colspan=9 |
|-  style="background:#FFBBBB;"
| 2014-03-29|| Loss || align=left| Ionuț Atodiresei || SuperKombat New Heroes || Romania || Decision|| 3 || 3:00
|-  style="background:#FFBBBB;"
| 2013-11-30|| Loss || align=left| Thanasios Karousos || Best fighter 2013 || Greece || Decision|| 3 || 3:00
|-  style="background:#cfc;"
| 2013-06-02|| Win|| align=left| Mohammad Usman || KIMBO 1 || Greece || KO (Left Hook)|| 2 ||
|-  style="background:#cfc;"
| 2013-05-18 || Win||align=left| Ionuț Atodiresei || SuperKombat World Grand Prix II 2013 || Craiova, Romania || TKO (referee stoppage) || 2 || 2:59
|-  style="background:#FFBBBB;"
| 2013-03-03|| Loss|| align=left| Kostas Mirzaev|| Fightsports Tournament, Semi Final || Greece || Decision|| 3 || 3:00
|-  style="background:#cfc;"
| 2012-12-15|| Win || align=left|  Dionisis Gkikas || K-1 World MAX 2012 World Championship Tournament Final || Athens, Greece || Decision (Unanimous) || 3 || 3:00
|-  style="background:#cfc;"
| 2012-06|| Win|| align=left| Nikos Syllas|| The Battle 3, Final || Greece || ||  ||
|-  style="background:#cfc;"
| 2012-06|| Win|| align=left| Kostas Mirzaev|| The Battle 3, Semi FInal || Greece || Decision|| 3 || 3:00
|-  style="background:#cfc;"
| 2012-04-01|| Win|| align=left| Yasih Denir|| Gladiator Nights 6 || Greece ||Decision || 3 || 3:00
|-  style="background:#cfc;"
| 2012|| Win|| align=left| Haris Gasteratos|| JOYA Kickboxing Championship || Greece || ||  ||
|-  style="background:#cfc;"
| 2011|| Win || align=left| Nikos Gikas || The Battle 3 || Athens, Greece || Decision (Unanimous) || 3 || 3:00
|-  style="background:#cfc;"
| 2011-04-10|| Win || align=left| Kadir Yener || Gladiatior Nights 5|| Athens, Greece || KO (Left Hook) || 2 ||
|-  style="background:#cfc;"
| 2011-03|| Win || align=left| Nikos Gikas || Iron Challenge 2 || Athens, Greece || Decision (Unanimous) || 3 || 3:00
|-  style="background:#FFBBBB;"
| 2010-02-27|| Loss || align=left| Florian Marku || No Limits 10|| Greece || Decision|| 3 || 3:00
|-  style="background:#cfc;"
| 2009-10-24|| Win|| align=left| Viktor Harder  || Kings Cup|| Germany || ||  ||
|-  style="background:#cfc;"
| 2009-09-26|| Win|| align=left| Thanasis Karagos  || Adidas Championship|| Greece || Decision || 3 || 3:00
|-  style="background:#FFBBBB;"
| 2009|| Loss || align=left| Alex Vogel || H-1 Last Chance|| Germany || Decision|| 3 || 3:00
|-  style="background:#FFBBBB;"
| 2009-03-22|| Win || align="left" | Ruben Narain|| Gladiatior Nights 3|| Athens, Greece || Decision|| 3 || 3:00
|-  style="background:#cfc;"
| 2008-08-14|| Win || align=left| Roël Rink || No Limits 5 || Greece || TKO  || 1 || 
|-
| colspan=9 | Legend:

See also
 List of male kickboxers

References

Living people
1987 births
Greek kickboxers
SUPERKOMBAT kickboxers